The Ophioparmaceae are a small family of lichen-forming fungi in the order Umbilicariales. The family was circumscribed in 1988 by lichenologists Roderick Westgarth Rogers and H. Thorsten Lumbsch.

Genera
 Boreoplaca  – 1 sp.
 Hypocenomyce  – 3 spp.
 Ophioparma  – 9 spp.
 Rhizoplacopsis  – 1 sp.

References

Umbilicariales
Lecanoromycetes families
Taxa described in 1988
Taxa named by Josef Hafellner
Lichen families